Abu Hafsa Yazid was a mawla, or servant, of the Umayyad Caliph Marwan ibn al-Hakkam. Yazid's full name is not known; Abu Hafsa means "father of Hafsa" (see Arabic name).

Marwan freed Yazid and assigned him posts including taxation in Medina. He married the daughter of the amir of al-Yamama, and among their descendants were several prominent poets of the early Islamic period, including Marwan ibn Abi Hafsa and Marwan ibn Abi al-Janub.

Abu Hafsa Yazid's origins are unclear; he may have been either Persian or Jewish. He may have been taken prisoner as a youth in the capture of Istakhr in ca 650 CE, and later sold to the Caliph. He was freed on the day of the assassination of Uthman ibn Affan. Sources vary as to whether Abu Hafsa Yazid converted to Islam or retained his Jewish faith.

Abu Hafsa Yazid is sometimes described as court physician to the Caliph Umar I around the year 643 CE, however this may be an error based on writings by later Arab historians, as he is not called a physician in the earliest texts.

References

Physicians from the Umayyad Caliphate
Medieval Jewish physicians
Jews from the Umayyad Caliphate
Year of birth unknown
Year of death unknown
7th-century Iranian physicians
7th-century people from the Umayyad Caliphate
7th-century Jews